The following is a list of players, both past and current, who appeared at least in one game for the Orlando Magic NBA franchise.



Players
Note: Statistics are correct through the end of the  season.

A

|-
|align="left"| || align="center"|F || align="left"|San Jose State || align="center"|1 || align="center"| || 46 || 1,205 || 239 || 72 || 563 || 26.2 || 5.2 || 1.6 || 12.2 || align=center|
|-
|align="left"| || align="center"|F/C || align="left"|Oral Roberts || align="center"|3 || align="center"|– || 216 || 3,930 || 1,042 || 114 || 855 || 18.2 || 4.8 || 0.5 || 4.0 || align=center|
|-
|align="left"| || align="center"|G/F || align="left"|UCLA || align="center"|3 || align="center"|– || 190 || 5,541 || 567 || 484 || 2,566 || 29.2 || 3.0 || 2.5 || 13.5 || align=center|
|-
|align="left"| || align="center"|G || align="left"|Virginia || align="center"|1 || align="center"| || 26 || 227 || 25 || 36 || 52 || 8.7 || 1.0 || 1.4 || 2.0 || align=center|
|-
|align="left"| || align="center"|F/C || align="left"|Villanova || align="center"|1 || align="center"| || 18 || 178 || 32 || 4 || 23 || 9.9 || 1.8 || 0.2 || 1.3 || align=center|
|-
|align="left"| || align="center"|G || align="left"|Fresno State || align="center"|1 || align="center"| || 29 || 856 || 83 || 148 || 348 || 29.5 || 2.9 || 5.1 || 12.0 || align=center|
|-
|align="left"| || align="center"|F/C || align="left"|Penn State || align="center"|2 || align="center"|– || 162 || 3,394 || 534 || 169 || 1,486 || 21.0 || 3.3 || 1.0 || 9.2 || align=center|
|-
|align="left"| || align="center"|G/F || align="left"|Illinois || align="center" bgcolor="#CFECEC"|10 || align="center"|– || bgcolor="#CFECEC"|692 || 22,440 || 3,667 || 1,937 || 10,650 || 32.4 || 5.3 || 2.8 || 15.4 || align=center|
|-
|align="left"| || align="center"|F || align="left"|California || align="center"|3 || align="center"|– || 188 || 4,299 || 1,028 || 143 || 2,148 || 22.9 || 5.5 || 0.8 || 11.4 || align=center|
|-
|align="left"| || align="center"|F || align="left"|Alabama || align="center"|2 || align="center"|– || 139 || 2,098 || 615 || 65 || 1,005 || 15.1 || 4.4 || 0.5 || 7.2 || align=center|
|-
|align="left"| || align="center"|G || align="left"|Michigan State || align="center"|1 || align="center"| || 5 || 27 || 1 || 1 || 6 || 5.4 || 0.2 || 0.2 || 1.2 || align=center|
|-
|align="left"| || align="center"|F || align="left"|Illinois || align="center"|1 || align="center"| || 1 || 4 || 1 || 0 || 2 || 4.0 || 1.0 || 0.0 || 2.0 || align=center|
|-
|align="left"| || align="center"|G || align="left"|Arizona || align="center"|1 || align="center"| || 49 || 1,070 || 119 || 157 || 392 || 21.8 || 2.4 || 3.2 || 8.0 || align=center|
|-
|align="left"| || align="center"|F || align="left"|UCLA || align="center"|3 || align="center"|– || 89 || 1,683 || 354 || 88 || 641 || 18.9 || 4.0 || 1.0 || 7.2 || align=center|
|-
|align="left"| || align="center"|G || align="left"|Iowa || align="center"|1 || align="center"| || 22 || 180 || 23 || 34 || 48 || 8.2 || 1.0 || 1.5 || 2.2 || align=center|
|-
|align="left"| || align="center"|G || align="left"|Fayetteville State || align="center"|9 || align="center"|– || 502 || 14,234 || 1,645 || 2,555 || 5,898 || 28.4 || 3.3 || 5.1 || 11.7 || align=center|
|-
|align="left"| || align="center"|G || align="left"|FIU || align="center"|3 || align="center"|– || 161 || 3,167 || 307 || 498 || 1,273 || 19.7 || 1.9 || 3.1 || 7.9 || align=center|
|-
|align="left"| || align="center"|G/F || align="left"|Pittsburgh || align="center"|1 || align="center"| || 15 || 279 || 38 || 18 || 77 || 18.6 || 2.5 || 1.2 || 5.1 || align=center|
|-
|align="left"| || align="center"|G || align="left"|South Florida || align="center"|1 || align="center"| || 82 || 1,626 || 126 || 306 || 782 || 19.8 || 1.5 || 3.7 || 9.5 || align=center|
|-
|align="left"| || align="center"|G/F || align="left"|UNLV || align="center"|2 || align="center"|– || 91 || 1,048 || 152 || 59 || 264 || 11.5 || 1.7 || 0.6 || 2.9 || align=center|
|-
|align="left" bgcolor="#CCFFCC"|x || align="center"|G || align="left"|Texas || align="center"|3 || align="center"|– || 234 || 5,567 || 480 || 922 || 2,330 || 23.8 || 2.1 || 3.9 || 10.0 || align=center|
|-
|align="left"| || align="center"|F || align="left"|Illinois || align="center"|2 || align="center"|– || 27 || 156 || 33 || 4 || 42 || 5.8 || 1.2 || 0.1 || 1.6 || align=center|
|-
|align="left"| || align="center"|C || align="left"|Arizona State || align="center"|1 || align="center"| || 49 || 1,259 || 237 || 89 || 477 || 25.7 || 4.8 || 1.8 || 9.7 || align=center|
|-
|align="left"| || align="center"|F || align="left"|Seton Hall || align="center"|2 || align="center"|– || 112 || 1,742 || 477 || 73 || 402 || 15.6 || 4.3 || 0.7 || 3.6 || align=center|
|-
|align="left"| || align="center"|C || align="left"|Mexico || align="center"|1 || align="center"| || 43 || 571 || 140 || 59 || 153 || 13.3 || 3.3 || 1.4 || 3.6 || align=center|
|}

B to C

|-
|align="left" bgcolor="#CCFFCC"|x || align="center"|C || align="left"|Texas || align="center"|1 || align="center"| || 47 || 766 || 233 || 39 || 292 || 16.3 || 5.0 || 0.8 || 6.2 || align=center|
|-
|align="left"| || align="center"|F || align="left"|UCLA || align="center"|1 || align="center"| || 81 || 2,097 || 445 || 134 || 716 || 25.9 || 5.5 || 1.7 || 8.8 || align=center|
|-
|align="left"| || align="center"|G || align="left"|Seton Hall || align="center"|1 || align="center"| || 11 || 169 || 21 || 27 || 62 || 15.4 || 1.9 || 2.5 || 5.6 || align=center|
|-
|align="left"| || align="center"|F || align="left"|LSU || align="center"|2 || align="center"|– || 126 || 2,628 || 551 || 76 || 1,144 || 20.9 || 4.4 || 0.6 || 9.1 || align=center|
|-
|align="left"| || align="center"|F/C || align="left"|Texas Tech || align="center"|4 || align="center"|– || 306 || 6,886 || 1,531 || 157 || 1,819 || 22.5 || 5.0 || 0.5 || 5.9 || align=center|
|-
|align="left"| || align="center"|F || align="left"|Alabama || align="center"|1 || align="center"| || 24 || 324 || 62 || 8 || 138 || 13.5 || 2.6 || 0.3 || 5.8 || align=center|
|-
|align="left" bgcolor="#CCFFCC"|x || align="center"|F/C || align="left"|UNLV || align="center"|2 || align="center"|– || 92 || 1,221 || 370 || 72 || 418 || 13.3 || 4.0 || 0.8 || 4.5 || align=center|
|-
|align="left"| || align="center"|F/C || align="left"|DR Congo || align="center"|2 || align="center"|– || 163 || 3,288 || 1,035 || 140 || 951 || 20.2 || 6.3 || 0.9 || 5.8 || align=center|
|-
|align="left"| || align="center"|G/F || align="left"|Kentucky || align="center"|4 || align="center"|– || 250 || 5,762 || 787 || 292 || 1,696 || 23.0 || 3.1 || 1.2 || 6.8 || align=center|
|-
|align="left"| || align="center"|F || align="left"|Saint Louis || align="center"|1 || align="center"| || 4 || 43 || 19 || 4 || 13 || 10.8 || 4.8 || 1.0 || 3.3 || align=center|
|-
|align="left"| || align="center"|G/F || align="left"|Oklahoma || align="center"|5 || align="center"|– || 350 || 6,769 || 821 || 704 || 2,431 || 19.3 || 2.3 || 2.0 || 6.9 || align=center|
|-
|align="left"| || align="center"|G || align="left"|Eastern Michigan || align="center"|1 || align="center"| || 1 || 8 || 1 || 3 || 6 || 8.0 || 1.0 || 3.0 || 6.0 || align=center|
|-
|align="left"| || align="center"|F/C || align="left"|Villanova || align="center"|1 || align="center"| || 8 || 55 || 14 || 2 || 6 || 6.9 || 1.8 || 0.3 || 0.8 || align=center|
|-
|align="left"| || align="center"|G || align="left"|Kentucky || align="center"|1 || align="center"| || 39 || 559 || 74 || 87 || 136 || 14.3 || 1.9 || 2.2 || 3.5 || align=center|
|-
|align="left"| || align="center"|G/F || align="left"|Stanford || align="center"|1 || align="center"| || 2 || 16 || 7 || 2 || 9 || 8.0 || 3.5 || 1.0 || 4.5 || align=center|
|-
|align="left"| || align="center"|G || align="left"|Jacksonville || align="center"|2 || align="center"|– || 14 || 220 || 20 || 14 || 55 || 15.7 || 1.4 || 1.0 || 3.9 || align=center|
|-
|align="left"| || align="center"|G/F || align="left"|Arizona || align="center"|1 || align="center"| || 60 || 630 || 108 || 29 || 105 || 10.5 || 1.8 || 0.5 || 1.8 || align=center|
|-
|align="left"| || align="center"|F/C || align="left"|Auburn || align="center"|1 || align="center"| || 62 || 783 || 146 || 23 || 267 || 12.6 || 2.4 || 0.4 || 4.3 || align=center|
|-
|align="left"| || align="center"|G/F || align="left"|North Carolina || align="center"|2 || align="center"|– || 97 || 2,974 || 383 || 300 || 1,577 || 30.7 || 3.9 || 3.1 || 16.3 || align=center|
|-
|align="left" bgcolor="#CCFFCC"|x || align="center"|G || align="left"|Syracuse || align="center"|1 || align="center"| || 12 || 227 || 57 || 49 || 65 || 18.9 || 4.8 || 4.1 || 5.4 || align=center|
|-
|align="left"| || align="center"|F || align="left"|South Alabama || align="center"|4 || align="center"|– || 224 || 6,613 || 1,513 || 244 || 3,433 || 29.5 || 6.8 || 1.1 || 15.3 || align=center|
|-
|align="left"| || align="center"|C || align="left"|Iowa State || align="center"|2 || align="center"|– || 85 || 1,824 || 479 || 42 || 520 || 21.5 || 5.6 || 0.5 || 6.1 || align=center|
|-
|align="left"| || align="center"|G || align="left"|Cincinnati || align="center"|1 || align="center"| || 4 || 16 || 3 || 4 || 10 || 4.0 || 0.8 || 1.0 || 2.5 || align=center|
|-
|align="left"| || align="center"|G/F || align="left"|Pepperdine || align="center"|1 || align="center"| || 21 || 529 || 54 || 46 || 119 || 25.2 || 2.6 || 2.2 || 5.7 || align=center|
|-
|align="left"| || align="center"|F || align="left"|Louisville || align="center"|2 || align="center"|– || 78 || 951 || 208 || 23 || 257 || 12.2 || 2.7 || 0.3 || 3.3 || align=center|
|-
|align="left"| || align="center"|F/C || align="left"|Arizona || align="center"|1 || align="center"| || 2 || 2 || 0 || 0 || 0 || 1.0 || 0.0 || 0.0 || 0.0 || align=center|
|-
|align="left"| || align="center"|F || align="left"|Illinois || align="center"|2 || align="center"|– || 66 || 705 || 126 || 28 || 286 || 10.7 || 1.9 || 0.4 || 4.3 || align=center|
|-
|align="left"| || align="center"|G || align="left"|NC State || align="center"|2 || align="center"|– || 60 || 843 || 85 || 157 || 297 || 14.1 || 1.4 || 2.6 || 5.0 || align=center|
|-
|align="left"| || align="center"|C || align="left"|DePaul || align="center"|1 || align="center"| || 6 || 79 || 18 || 2 || 22 || 13.2 || 3.0 || 0.3 || 3.7 || align=center|
|}

D to G

|-
|align="left"| || align="center"|F/C || align="left"|LSU || align="center"|3 || align="center"|– || 140 || 3,845 || 859 || 187 || 1,623 || 27.5 || 6.1 || 1.3 || 11.6 || align=center|
|-
|align="left"| || align="center"|F/C || align="left"|Florida || align="center"|5 || align="center"|– || 284 || 4,123 || 1,065 || 150 || 1,027 || 14.5 || 3.8 || 0.5 || 3.6 || align=center|
|-
|align="left"| || align="center"|C || align="left"|USC || align="center"|3 || align="center"|– || 133 || 1,784 || 601 || 24 || 530 || 13.4 || 4.5 || 0.2 || 4.0 || align=center|
|-
|align="left"| || align="center"|G || align="left"|Pacific || align="center"|1 || align="center"| || 2 || 10 || 0 || 0 || 2 || 5.0 || 0.0 || 0.0 || 1.0 || align=center|
|-
|align="left"| || align="center"|G || align="left"|Eastern Michigan || align="center"|1 || align="center"| || 9 || 86 || 13 || 2 || 26 || 9.6 || 1.4 || 0.2 || 2.9 || align=center|
|-
|align="left"| || align="center"|G || align="left"|Marquette || align="center"|2 || align="center"|– || 49 || 534 || 39 || 51 || 186 || 10.9 || 0.8 || 1.0 || 3.8 || align=center|
|-
|align="left"| || align="center"|C || align="left"|Utah || align="center"|3 || align="center"|– || 207 || 3,513 || 755 || 148 || 1,359 || 17.0 || 3.6 || 0.7 || 6.6 || align=center|
|-
|align="left"| || align="center"|G || align="left"|Missouri || align="center"|3 || align="center"|– || 188 || 3,906 || 265 || 354 || 1,572 || 20.8 || 1.4 || 1.9 || 8.4 || align=center|
|-
|align="left"| || align="center"|G || align="left"|Duke || align="center"|2 || align="center"|– || 114 || 2,000 || 154 || 269 || 362 || 17.5 || 1.4 || 2.4 || 3.2 || align=center|
|-
|align="left"| || align="center"|G || align="left"|DePaul || align="center"|1 || align="center"| || 12 || 135 || 20 || 13 || 59 || 11.3 || 1.7 || 1.1 || 4.9 || align=center|
|-
|align="left"| || align="center"|F || align="left"|Indiana || align="center"|2 || align="center"|– || 58 || 620 || 93 || 38 || 226 || 10.7 || 1.6 || 0.7 || 3.9 || align=center|
|-
|align="left"| || align="center"|G || align="left"|Texas || align="center"|1 || align="center"| || 68 || 1,624 || 209 || 69 || 633 || 23.9 || 3.1 || 1.0 || 9.3 || align=center|
|-
|align="left" bgcolor="#FFFF99"|^ || align="center"|F/C || align="left"|Georgetown || align="center"|1 || align="center"| || 65 || 901 || 263 || 35 || 390 || 13.9 || 4.0 || 0.5 || 6.0 || align=center|
|-
|align="left" bgcolor="#CCFFCC"|x || align="center"|G/F || align="left"|France || align="center"|5 || align="center"|– || 343 || 10,851 || 1,025 || 995 || 5,317 || 31.6 || 3.0 || 2.9 || 15.5 || align=center|
|-
|align="left"| || align="center"|C || align="left"|Colgate || align="center"|2 || align="center"|– || 91 || 833 || 234 || 19 || 173 || 9.2 || 2.6 || 0.2 || 1.9 || align=center|
|-
|align="left"| || align="center"|G || align="left"|Maryland || align="center"|2 || align="center"|– || 124 || 4,712 || 669 || 809 || 2,410 || 38.0 || 5.4 || 6.5 || 19.4 || align=center|
|-
|align="left" bgcolor="#CCFFCC"|x || align="center"|G || align="left"|Tulane || align="center"|1 || align="center"| || 10 || 44 || 5 || 1 || 15 || 4.4 || 0.5 || 0.1 || 1.5 || align=center|
|-
|align="left"| || align="center"|F/C || align="left"|Arizona || align="center"|2 || align="center"|– || 119 || 2,624 || 434 || 139 || 778 || 22.1 || 3.6 || 1.2 || 6.5 || align=center|
|-
|align="left"| || align="center"|G || align="left"|Louisville || align="center"|1 || align="center"| || 38 || 364 || 39 || 40 || 69 || 9.6 || 1.0 || 1.1 || 1.8 || align=center|
|-
|align="left"| || align="center"|G/F || align="left"|George Washington || align="center"|1 || align="center"| || 5 || 43 || 7 || 0 || 0 || 8.6 || 1.4 || 0.0 || 0.0 || align=center|
|-
|align="left"| || align="center"|G || align="left"|Illinois || align="center"|1 || align="center"| || 3 || 23 || 1 || 2 || 4 || 7.7 || 0.3 || 0.7 || 1.3 || align=center|
|-
|align="left"| || align="center"|F || align="left"|Notre Dame || align="center"|9 || align="center"|– || 513 || 10,524 || 1,382 || 425 || 3,800 || 20.5 || 2.7 || 0.8 || 7.4 || align=center|
|-
|align="left"| || align="center"|F/C || align="left"|Old Dominion || align="center"|1 || align="center"| || 45 || 1,041 || 297 || 40 || 598 || 23.1 || 6.6 || 0.9 || 13.3 || align=center|
|-
|align="left"| || align="center"|G || align="left"|Georgia Tech || align="center"|1 || align="center"| || 5 || 48 || 9 || 3 || 14 || 9.6 || 1.8 || 0.6 || 2.8 || align=center|
|-
|align="left"| || align="center"|G/F || align="left"|Croatia || align="center"|2 || align="center"|– || 75 || 2,396 || 294 || 147 || 876 || 31.9 || 3.9 || 2.0 || 11.7 || align=center|
|-
|align="left"| || align="center"|F || align="left"|Kansas || align="center"|2 || align="center"|– || 98 || 2,678 || 676 || 109 || 1,173 || 27.3 || 6.9 || 1.1 || 12.0 || align=center|
|-
|align="left" bgcolor="#CCFFCC"|x || align="center"|F || align="left"|Arizona || align="center"|5 || align="center"|– || 341 || 9,500 || 2,112 || 736 || 4,249 || 27.9 || 6.2 || 2.2 || 12.5 || align=center|
|-
|align="left"| || align="center"|G || align="left"|UConn || align="center"|1 || align="center"| || 56 || 790 || 63 || 50 || 349 || 14.1 || 1.1 || 0.9 || 6.2 || align=center|
|-
|align="left"| || align="center"|F/C || align="left"|Poland || align="center"|4 || align="center"|– || 175 || 2,319 || 761 || 50 || 650 || 13.3 || 4.3 || 0.3 || 3.7 || align=center|
|-
|align="left"| || align="center"|F/C || align="left"|Clemson || align="center"|7 || align="center"|–– || 411 || 14,233 || 3,353 || 879 || 4,638 || 34.6 || 8.2 || 2.1 || 11.3 || align=center|
|-
|align="left"| || align="center"|G || align="left"|Notre Dame || align="center"|1 || align="center"| || 60 || 939 || 98 || 156 || 250 || 15.7 || 1.6 || 2.6 || 4.2 || align=center|
|-
|align="left"| || align="center"|F || align="left"|Georgetown || align="center"|1 || align="center"| || 69 || 1,534 || 214 || 81 || 638 || 22.2 || 3.1 || 1.2 || 9.2 || align=center|
|-
|align="left"| || align="center"|G || align="left"|Georgia || align="center"|2 || align="center"|– || 81 || 752 || 46 || 125 || 308 || 9.3 || 0.6 || 1.5 || 3.8 || align=center|
|-
|align="left"| || align="center"|F/C || align="left"|UNLV || align="center"|1 || align="center"| || 73 || 1,860 || 588 || 99 || 761 || 25.5 || 8.1 || 1.4 || 10.4 || align=center|
|-
|align="left"| || align="center"|G || align="left"|Detroit Mercy || align="center"|1 || align="center"| || 52 || 951 || 79 || 68 || 306 || 18.3 || 1.5 || 1.3 || 5.9 || align=center|
|}

H to I

|-
|align="left"| || align="center"|C || align="left"|LSU || align="center"|3 || align="center"|– || 5 || 17 || 6 || 2 || 10 || 3.4 || 1.2 || 0.4 || 2.0 || align=center|
|-
|align="left" bgcolor="#FFCC00"|+ || align="center"|G/F || align="left"|Memphis || align="center"|6 || align="center"|– || 369 || 13,721 || 1,752 || 2,343 || 7,018 || 37.2 || 4.7 || 6.3 || 19.0 || align=center|
|-
|align="left"| || align="center"|G/F || align="left"|St. John's || align="center"|3 || align="center"|– || 201 || 4,598 || 705 || 155 || 1,375 || 22.9 || 3.5 || 0.8 || 6.8 || align=center|
|-
|align="left"| || align="center"|G || align="left"|Illinois || align="center"|1 || align="center"| || 66 || 1,761 || 103 || 233 || 566 || 26.7 || 1.6 || 3.5 || 8.6 || align=center|
|-
|align="left"| || align="center"|F || align="left"|Richmond || align="center"|1 || align="center"| || 14 || 84 || 12 || 2 || 20 || 6.0 || 0.9 || 0.1 || 1.4 || align=center|
|-
|align="left"| || align="center"|F || align="left"|Georgia Tech || align="center"|2 || align="center"|– || 54 || 1,177 || 226 || 53 || 424 || 21.8 || 4.2 || 1.0 || 7.9 || align=center|
|-
|align="left"| || align="center"|F || align="left"|St. Patrick HS (NJ) || align="center"|1 || align="center"| || 10 || 119 || 27 || 10 || 51 || 11.9 || 2.7 || 1.0 || 5.1 || align=center|
|-
|align="left"| || align="center"|F || align="left"|Tennessee || align="center"|4 || align="center"|– || 205 || 6,803 || 1,426 || 361 || 3,193 || 33.2 || 7.0 || 1.8 || 15.6 || align=center|
|-
|align="left"| || align="center"|F || align="left"|Florida || align="center"|1 || align="center"| || 24 || 345 || 72 || 8 || 98 || 14.4 || 3.0 || 0.3 || 4.1 || align=center|
|-
|align="left"| || align="center"|G/F || align="left"|Croatia || align="center"|3 || align="center"|– || 219 || 4,030 || 603 || 277 || 1,517 || 18.4 || 2.8 || 1.3 || 6.9 || align=center|
|-
|align="left"| || align="center"|G/F || align="left"|Michigan || align="center"|1 || align="center"| || 32 || 580 || 94 || 37 || 276 || 18.1 || 2.9 || 1.2 || 8.6 || align=center|
|-
|align="left" bgcolor="#FFFF99"|^ || align="center"|G/F || align="left"|Duke || align="center"|6 || align="center"|–– || 200 || 6,448 || 991 || 617 || 3,280 || 32.2 || 5.0 || 3.1 || 16.4 || align=center|
|-
|align="left" bgcolor="#FFCC00"|+ || align="center"|C || align="left"|SACA (GA) || align="center"|8 || align="center"|– || 621 || bgcolor="#CFECEC"|22,471 || bgcolor="#CFECEC"|8,072 || 935 || bgcolor="#CFECEC"|11,435 || 36.2 || bgcolor="#CFECEC"|13.0 || 1.5 || 18.4 || align=center|
|-
|align="left"| || align="center"|F || align="left"|Michigan || align="center"|1 || align="center"| || 81 || 2,877 || 570 || 158 || 1,376 || 35.5 || 7.0 || 2.0 || 17.0 || align=center|
|-
|align="left"| || align="center"|G || align="left"|Southern Illinois || align="center"|2 || align="center"|– || 156 || 2,862 || 250 || 417 || 1,307 || 18.3 || 1.6 || 2.7 || 8.4 || align=center|
|-
|align="left"| || align="center"|G || align="left"|Saint Louis || align="center"|1 || align="center"| || 9 || 114 || 5 || 7 || 12 || 12.7 || 0.6 || 0.8 || 1.3 || align=center|
|-
|align="left"| || align="center"|F || align="left"|Notre Dame || align="center"|1 || align="center"| || 35 || 322 || 69 || 7 || 64 || 9.2 || 2.0 || 0.2 || 1.8 || align=center|
|-
|align="left"| || align="center"|F || align="left"|Ohio || align="center"|1 || align="center"| || 31 || 224 || 69 || 3 || 95 || 7.2 || 2.2 || 0.1 || 3.1 || align=center|
|-
|align="left"| || align="center"|C || align="left"|DePaul || align="center"|3 || align="center"|– || 145 || 1,752 || 360 || 23 || 506 || 12.1 || 2.5 || 0.2 || 3.5 || align=center|
|-
|align="left" bgcolor="#CCFFCC"|x || align="center"|F/C || align="left"|Congo || align="center"|1 || align="center"| || 56 || 1,710 || 382 || 60 || 846 || 30.5 || 6.8 || 1.1 || 15.1 || align=center|
|-
|align="left"| || align="center"|F || align="left"|Turkey || align="center"|1 || align="center"| || 22 || 447 || 121 || 12 || 178 || 20.3 || 5.5 || 0.5 || 8.1 || align=center|
|-
|align="left"| || align="center"|F || align="left"|Florida State || align="center"|2 || align="center"|– || 102 || 2,532 || 510 || 98 || 865 || 24.8 || 5.0 || 1.0 || 8.5 || align=center|
|-
|align="left" bgcolor="#CCFFCC"|x || align="center"|F || align="left"|Kansas State || align="center"|2 || align="center"|– || 130 || 2,253 || 321 || 130 || 568 || 17.3 || 2.5 || 1.0 || 4.4 || align=center|
|}

J to L

|-
|align="left"| || align="center"|G/F || align="left"|Georgetown || align="center"|1 || align="center"| || 9 || 144 || 17 || 8 || 39 || 16.0 || 1.9 || 0.9 || 4.3 || align=center|
|-
|align="left"| || align="center"|F || align="left"|Duke || align="center"|1 || align="center"| || 12 || 68 || 21 || 3 || 27 || 5.7 || 1.8 || 0.3 || 2.3 || align=center|
|-
|align="left"| || align="center"|G || align="left"|Oak Hill Academy (VA) || align="center"|1 || align="center"| || 25 || 452 || 50 || 100 || 175 || 18.1 || 2.0 || 4.0 || 7.0 || align=center|
|-
|align="left"| || align="center"|F || align="left"|Utah || align="center"|1 || align="center"| || 20 || 290 || 45 || 12 || 42 || 14.5 || 2.3 || 0.6 || 2.1 || align=center|
|-
|align="left"| || align="center"|G || align="left"|College of Charleston || align="center"|3 || align="center"|– || 129 || 2,101 || 207 || 276 || 613 || 16.3 || 1.6 || 2.1 || 4.8 || align=center|
|-
|align="left"| || align="center"|F || align="left"|Miami (FL) || align="center"|1 || align="center"| || 63 || 803 || 105 || 16 || 233 || 12.7 || 1.7 || 0.3 || 3.7 || align=center|
|-
|align="left"| || align="center"|G || align="left"|UCF || align="center"|1 || align="center"| || 10 || 116 || 13 || 6 || 23 || 11.6 || 1.3 || 0.6 || 2.3 || align=center|
|-
|align="left"| || align="center"|F || align="left"|South Florida || align="center"|1 || align="center"| || 11 || 85 || 16 || 2 || 14 || 7.7 || 1.5 || 0.2 || 1.3 || align=center|
|-
|align="left"| || align="center"|C || align="left"|Croatia || align="center"|2 || align="center"|– || 73 || 569 || 188 || 11 || 198 || 7.8 || 2.6 || 0.2 || 2.7 || align=center|
|-
|align="left"| || align="center"|F/C || align="left"|Concord HS (IN) || align="center"|1 || align="center"| || 79 || 1,633 || 451 || 55 || 537 || 20.7 || 5.7 || 0.7 || 6.8 || align=center|
|-
|align="left"| || align="center"|F/C || align="left"|Notre Dame || align="center"|1 || align="center"| || 3 || 15 || 1 || 1 || 0 || 5.0 || 0.3 || 0.3 || 0.0 || align=center|
|-
|align="left"| || align="center"|C || align="left"|East Carolina || align="center"|1 || align="center"| || 1 || 5 || 0 || 0 || 0 || 5.0 || 0.0 || 0.0 || 0.0 || align=center|
|-
|align="left"| || align="center"|G || align="left"|Arizona || align="center"|1 || align="center"| || 47 || 440 || 38 || 59 || 122 || 9.4 || 0.8 || 1.3 || 2.6 || align=center|
|-
|align="left"| || align="center"|C || align="left"|BYU || align="center"|4 || align="center"|– || 247 || 4,653 || 1,253 || 117 || 746 || 18.8 || 5.1 || 0.5 || 3.0 || align=center|
|-
|align="left"| || align="center"|F/C || align="left"|SMU || align="center"|1 || align="center"| || 67 || 1,288 || 272 || 51 || 203 || 19.2 || 4.1 || 0.8 || 3.0 || align=center|
|-
|align="left"| || align="center"|F/C || align="left"|Montana || align="center"|1 || align="center"| || 34 || 682 || 123 || 35 || 173 || 20.1 || 3.6 || 1.0 || 5.1 || align=center|
|-
|align="left"| || align="center"|G || align="left"|Kentucky || align="center"|2 || align="center"|– || 77 || 992 || 78 || 55 || 267 || 12.9 || 1.0 || 0.7 || 3.5 || align=center|
|-
|align="left"| || align="center"|C || align="left"|Villanova || align="center"|1 || align="center"| || 17 || 80 || 27 || 5 || 26 || 4.7 || 1.6 || 0.3 || 1.5 || align=center|
|-
|align="left"| || align="center"|G || align="left"|Western Kentucky || align="center"|1 || align="center"| || 77 || 1,939 || 178 || 91 || 646 || 25.2 || 2.3 || 1.2 || 8.4 || align=center|
|-
|align="left"| || align="center"|F || align="left"|Alief Elsik HS (TX) || align="center"|4 || align="center"|– || 257 || 9,114 || 1,314 || 537 || 4,194 || 35.5 || 5.1 || 2.1 || 16.3 || align=center|
|-
|align="left"| || align="center"|G/F || align="left"|Stanford || align="center"|1 || align="center"| || 4 || 20 || 4 || 2 || 8 || 5.0 || 1.0 || 0.5 || 2.0 || align=center|
|-
|align="left"| || align="center"|G || align="left"|Kentucky || align="center"|1 || align="center"| || 17 || 115 || 15 || 5 || 33 || 6.8 || 0.9 || 0.3 || 1.9 || align=center|
|-
|align="left"| || align="center"|G || align="left"|Nebraska || align="center"|2 || align="center"| || 90 || 2,461 || 198 || 331 || 841 || 27.3 || 2.2 || 3.7 || 9.3 || align=center|
|}

M to N

|-
|align="left"| || align="center"|G || align="left"|Butler || align="center"|1 || align="center"| || 69 || 1,365 || 166 || 272 || 473 || 19.8 || 2.4 || 3.9 || 6.9 || align=center|
|-
|align="left"| || align="center"|F || align="left"|Duke || align="center"|1 || align="center"| || 77 || 1,370 || 303 || 61 || 646 || 17.8 || 3.9 || 0.8 || 8.4 || align=center|
|-
|align="left"| || align="center"|G/F || align="left"|Iowa || align="center"|2 || align="center"|– || 44 || 457 || 69 || 29 || 97 || 10.4 || 1.6 || 0.7 || 2.2 || align=center|
|-
|align="left"| || align="center"|F || align="left"|LSU || align="center"|1 || align="center"| || 42 || 328 || 73 || 18 || 115 || 7.8 || 1.7 || 0.4 || 2.7 || align=center|
|-
|align="left"| || align="center"|F || align="left"|Cincinnati || align="center"|1 || align="center"| || 34 || 488 || 86 || 9 || 109 || 14.4 || 2.5 || 0.3 || 3.2 || align=center|
|-
|align="left"| || align="center"|G || align="left"|Florida || align="center"|1 || align="center"| || 11 || 169 || 13 || 12 || 81 || 15.4 || 1.2 || 1.1 || 7.4 || align=center|
|-
|align="left"| || align="center"|F/C || align="left"|Marquette || align="center"|1 || align="center"| || 17 || 109 || 22 || 7 || 28 || 6.4 || 1.3 || 0.4 || 1.6 || align=center|
|-
|align="left" bgcolor="#FFFF99"|^ || align="center"|G/F || align="left"|MZCA (NC) || align="center"|4 || align="center"|– || 295 || 11,628 || 2,067 || 1,533 || 8,298 || bgcolor="#CFECEC"|39.4 || 7.0 || 5.2 || bgcolor="#CFECEC"|28.1 || align=center|
|-
|align="left"| || align="center"|F/C || align="left"|California || align="center"|1 || align="center"| || 2 || 13 || 4 || 0 || 0 || 6.5 || 2.0 || 0.0 || 0.0 || align=center|
|-
|align="left"| || align="center"|F || align="left"|Duke || align="center"|1 || align="center"| || 41 || 685 || 137 || 70 || 159 || 16.7 || 3.3 || 1.7 || 3.9 || align=center|
|-
|align="left"| || align="center"|G || align="left"|Kentucky || align="center"|1 || align="center"| || 36 || 738 || 77 || 45 || 327 || 20.5 || 2.1 || 1.3 || 9.1 || align=center|
|-
|align="left"| || align="center"|G/F || align="left"|Kentucky || align="center"|1 || align="center"| || 31 || 969 || 98 || 54 || 470 || 31.3 || 3.2 || 1.7 || 15.2 || align=center|
|-
|align="left"| || align="center"|F/C || align="left"|Serbia || align="center"|2 || align="center"|– || 110 || 2,540 || 560 || 122 || 868 || 23.1 || 5.1 || 1.1 || 7.9 || align=center|
|-
|align="left"| || align="center"|G/F || align="left"|Florida || align="center"|3 || align="center"|– || 194 || 6,339 || 886 || 477 || 2,737 || 32.7 || 4.6 || 2.5 || 14.1 || align=center|
|-
|align="left"| || align="center"|G || align="left"|Rhode Island || align="center"|1 || align="center"| || 23 || 726 || 63 || 42 || 369 || 31.6 || 2.7 || 1.8 || 16.0 || align=center|
|-
|align="left"| || align="center"|G/F || align="left"|Purdue || align="center"|2 || align="center"|– || 154 || 3,188 || 303 || 318 || 1,087 || 20.7 || 2.0 || 2.1 || 7.1 || align=center|
|-
|align="left"| || align="center"|F || align="left"|Maryland || align="center"|1 || align="center"| || 22 || 192 || 38 || 4 || 35 || 8.7 || 1.7 || 0.2 || 1.6 || align=center|
|-
|align="left"| || align="center"|F || align="left"|TCU || align="center"|1 || align="center"| || 8 || 83 || 14 || 4 || 29 || 10.4 || 1.8 || 0.5 || 3.6 || align=center|
|-
|align="left"| || align="center"|G || align="left"|UConn || align="center"|1 || align="center"| || 55 || 600 || 55 || 97 || 203 || 10.9 || 1.0 || 1.8 || 3.7 || align=center|
|-
|align="left" bgcolor="#FFCC00"|+ || align="center"|G || align="left"|Saint Joseph's || align="center" bgcolor="#CFECEC"|10 || align="center"|– || 651 || 19,038 || 2,038 || bgcolor="#CFECEC"|3,501 || 8,184 || 29.2 || 3.1 || 5.4 || 12.6 || align=center|
|-
|align="left"| || align="center"|F || align="left"|St. Bonaventure || align="center"|4 || align="center"|– || 247 || 3,738 || 796 || 116 || 1,600 || 15.1 || 3.2 || 0.5 || 6.5 || align=center|
|}

O to P

|-
|align="left"| || align="center"|G || align="left"|Indiana || align="center"|3 || align="center"|– || 224 || 7,439 || 976 || 904 || 3,551 || 33.2 || 4.4 || 4.0 || 15.9 || align=center|
|-
|align="left"| || align="center"|C || align="left"|Seattle || align="center"|1 || align="center"| || 3 || 36 || 15 || 0 || 4 || 12.0 || 5.0 || 0.0 || 1.3 || align=center|
|-
|align="left"| || align="center"|G || align="left"|UConn || align="center"|2 || align="center"|– || 20 || 220 || 19 || 33 || 78 || 11.0 || 1.0 || 1.7 || 3.9 || align=center|
|-
|align="left" bgcolor="#FFFF99"|^ || align="center"|C || align="left"|LSU || align="center"|4 || align="center"|– || 295 || 11,164 || 3,691 || 716 || 8,019 || 37.8 || 12.5 || 2.4 || 27.2 || align=center|
|-
|align="left"| || align="center"|C || align="left"|Syracuse || align="center"|1 || align="center"| || 8 || 28 || 6 || 2 || 4 || 3.5 || 0.8 || 0.3 || 0.5 || align=center|
|-
|align="left"| || align="center"|F/C || align="left"|Norfolk State || align="center"|3 || align="center"|– || 177 || 2,650 || 772 || 189 || 955 || 15.0 || 4.4 || 1.1 || 5.4 || align=center|
|-
|align="left"| || align="center"|F/C || align="left"|Kentucky || align="center"|1 || align="center"| || 16 || 187 || 39 || 5 || 45 || 11.7 || 2.4 || 0.3 || 2.8 || align=center|
|-
|align="left"| || align="center"|F || align="left"|Houston || align="center"|8 || align="center"|–– || 360 || 9,646 || 2,160 || 777 || 2,252 || 26.8 || 6.0 || 2.2 || 6.3 || align=center|
|-
|align="left"| || align="center"|G || align="left"|La Salle || align="center"|1 || align="center"| || 6 || 33 || 2 || 3 || 18 || 5.5 || 0.3 || 0.5 || 3.0 || align=center|
|-
|align="left"| || align="center"|C || align="left"|Nigeria || align="center"|1 || align="center"| || 27 || 145 || 50 || 5 || 27 || 5.4 || 1.9 || 0.2 || 1.0 || align=center|
|-
|align="left"| || align="center"|C || align="left"|Georgia || align="center"|1 || align="center"| || 59 || 664 || 174 || 13 || 194 || 11.3 || 2.9 || 0.2 || 3.3 || align=center|
|-
|align="left"| || align="center"|G || align="left"|Bradley || align="center"|1 || align="center"| || 16 || 185 || 27 || 10 || 57 || 11.6 || 1.7 || 0.6 || 3.6 || align=center|
|-
|align="left"| || align="center"|F/C || align="left"|Michigan State || align="center"|1 || align="center"| || 5 || 43 || 9 || 0 || 21 || 8.6 || 1.8 || 0.0 || 4.2 || align=center|
|-
|align="left"| || align="center"|G || align="left"|Louisiana || align="center"|4 || align="center"|– || 281 || 8,303 || 1,171 || 1,805 || 3,128 || 29.5 || 4.2 || 6.4 || 11.1 || align=center|
|-
|align="left"| || align="center"|F || align="left"|Utah State || align="center"|1 || align="center"| || 10 || 89 || 24 || 3 || 32 || 8.9 || 2.4 || 0.3 || 3.2 || align=center|
|-
|align="left"| || align="center"|G || align="left"|Memphis || align="center"|1 || align="center"| || 6 || 39 || 4 || 5 || 10 || 6.5 || 0.7 || 0.8 || 1.7 || align=center|
|-
|align="left"| || align="center"|G/F || align="left"|France || align="center"|3 || align="center"|– || 148 || 3,434 || 441 || 124 || 1,288 || 23.2 || 3.0 || 0.8 || 8.7 || align=center|
|-
|align="left"| || align="center"|G || align="left"|Georgia Tech || align="center"|1 || align="center"| || 63 || 1,430 || 129 || 297 || 597 || 22.7 || 2.0 || 4.7 || 9.5 || align=center|
|-
|align="left"| || align="center"|G || align="left"|Utah Valley || align="center"|1 || align="center"| || 31 || 377 || 43 || 66 || 74 || 12.2 || 1.4 || 2.1 || 2.4 || align=center|
|-
|align="left"| || align="center"|G || align="left"|UConn || align="center"|1 || align="center"| || 16 || 290 || 27 || 17 || 96 || 18.1 || 1.7 || 1.1 || 6.0 || align=center|
|}

R to S

|-
|align="left"| || align="center"|G || align="left"|Duke || align="center"|7 || align="center"|– || 396 || 8,670 || 721 || 769 || 3,662 || 21.9 || 1.8 || 1.9 || 9.2 || align=center|
|-
|align="left"| || align="center"|F || align="left"|Georgetown || align="center"|2 || align="center"|– || 133 || 1,478 || 418 || 48 || 434 || 11.1 || 3.1 || 0.4 || 3.3 || align=center|
|-
|align="left"| || align="center"|G/F || align="left"|LSU || align="center"|3 || align="center"|– || 193 || 4,819 || 771 || 534 || 2,447 || 25.0 || 4.0 || 2.8 || 12.7 || align=center|
|-
|align="left"| || align="center"|G || align="left"|Michigan State || align="center"|2 || align="center"|– || 109 || 3,510 || 414 || 218 || 1,395 || 32.2 || 3.8 || 2.0 || 12.8 || align=center|
|-
|align="left"| || align="center"|G/F || align="left"|Delta State || align="center"|1 || align="center"| || 12 || 93 || 14 || 3 || 37 || 7.8 || 1.2 || 0.3 || 3.1 || align=center|
|-
|align="left"| || align="center"|G || align="left"|DePaul || align="center"|2 || align="center"|– || 105 || 1,821 || 301 || 76 || 464 || 17.3 || 2.9 || 0.7 || 4.4 || align=center|
|-
|align="left"| || align="center"|G || align="left"|Oregon || align="center"|1 || align="center"| || 47 || 683 || 68 || 96 || 188 || 14.5 || 1.4 || 2.0 || 4.0 || align=center|
|-
|align="left"| || align="center"|C || align="left"|LSU || align="center"|1 || align="center"| || 55 || 1,118 || 336 || 39 || 573 || 20.3 || 6.1 || 0.7 || 10.4 || align=center|
|-
|align="left"| || align="center"|G || align="left"|Alabama || align="center"|1 || align="center"| || 6 || 50 || 8 || 0 || 10 || 8.3 || 1.3 || 0.0 || 1.7 || align=center|
|-
|align="left"| || align="center"|C || align="left"|Clemson || align="center"|2 || align="center"|– || 96 || 862 || 191 || 18 || 137 || 9.0 || 2.0 || 0.2 || 1.4 || align=center|
|-
|align="left"| || align="center"|C || align="left"|Arizona || align="center"|1 || align="center"| || 20 || 270 || 47 || 18 || 61 || 13.5 || 2.4 || 0.9 || 3.1 || align=center|
|-
|align="left" bgcolor="#CCFFCC"|x || align="center"|G/F || align="left"|Washington || align="center"|3 || align="center"|– || 129 || 3,498 || 421 || 216 || 1,731 || 27.1 || 3.3 || 1.7 || 13.4 || align=center|
|-
|align="left"| || align="center"|F || align="left"|Notre Dame || align="center"|6 || align="center"|– || 288 || 5,844 || 980 || 383 || 2,242 || 20.3 || 3.4 || 1.3 || 7.8 || align=center|
|-
|align="left"| || align="center"|F || align="left"|Croatia || align="center"|1 || align="center"| || 45 || 314 || 25 || 20 || 82 || 7.0 || 0.6 || 0.4 || 1.8 || align=center|
|-
|align="left"| || align="center"|G || align="left"|SMU || align="center"|2 || align="center"|– || 82 || 1,061 || 191 || 67 || 204 || 12.9 || 2.3 || 0.8 || 2.5 || align=center|
|-
|align="left"| || align="center"|F/C || align="left"|Syracuse || align="center"|3 || align="center"|– || 138 || 1,955 || 381 || 62 || 567 || 14.2 || 2.8 || 0.4 || 4.1 || align=center|
|-
|align="left"| || align="center"|F || align="left"|Georgia Tech || align="center"|7 || align="center"|– || 446 || 13,692 || 1,363 || 1,034 || 6,603 || 30.7 || 3.1 || 2.3 || 14.8 || align=center|
|-
|align="left"| || align="center"|C || align="left"|Syracuse || align="center"|2 || align="center"|– || 121 || 4,099 || 1,058 || 161 || 1,981 || 33.9 || 8.7 || 1.3 || 16.4 || align=center|
|-
|align="left"| || align="center"|G || align="left"|UC Santa Barbara || align="center"|3 || align="center"|– || 230 || 5,382 || 659 || 1,061 || 1,550 || 23.4 || 2.9 || 4.6 || 6.7 || align=center|
|-
|align="left"| || align="center"|G/F || align="left"|Houston || align="center"|2 || align="center"|– || 110 || 2,874 || 339 || 266 || 1,245 || 26.1 || 3.1 || 2.4 || 11.3 || align=center|
|-
|align="left"| || align="center"|G || align="left"|Arizona || align="center"|1 || align="center"| || 5 || 19 || 2 || 0 || 2 || 3.8 || 0.4 || 0.0 || 0.4 || align=center|
|-
|align="left"| || align="center"|G || align="left"|Michigan State || align="center"|5 || align="center"|– || 384 || 11,940 || 1,110 || 2,776 || 4,966 || 31.1 || 2.9 || bgcolor="#CFECEC"|7.2 || 12.9 || align=center|
|-
|align="left"| || align="center"|G || align="left"|Wake Forest || align="center"|2 || align="center"|– || 56 || 549 || 72 || 89 || 130 || 9.8 || 1.3 || 1.6 || 2.3 || align=center|
|-
|align="left"| || align="center"|F/C || align="left"|Colorado State || align="center"|1 || align="center"| || 76 || 1,181 || 219 || 62 || 546 || 15.5 || 2.9 || 0.8 || 7.2 || align=center|
|-
|align="left"| || align="center"|G || align="left"|North Carolina || align="center"|1 || align="center"| || 6 || 47 || 2 || 4 || 17 || 7.8 || 0.3 || 0.7 || 2.8 || align=center|
|-
|align="left"| || align="center"|G/F || align="left"|Jacksonville || align="center"|3 || align="center"|– || 195 || 4,406 || 805 || 373 || 2,229 || 22.6 || 4.1 || 1.9 || 11.4 || align=center|
|-
|align="left"| || align="center"|F/C || align="left"|Florida || align="center"|1 || align="center"| || 52 || 675 || 133 || 40 || 402 || 13.0 || 2.6 || 0.8 || 7.7 || align=center|
|-
|align="left"| || align="center"|C || align="left"|Louisville || align="center"|1 || align="center"| || 1 || 19 || 6 || 1 || 4 || 19.0 || 6.0 || 1.0 || 4.0 || align=center|
|-
|align="left"| || align="center"|G || align="left"|Washington Union HS (CA) || align="center"|3 || align="center"|– || 163 || 4,670 || 463 || 295 || 1,620 || 28.7 || 2.8 || 1.8 || 9.9 || align=center|
|-
|align="left"| || align="center"|G || align="left"|DePaul || align="center"|1 || align="center"| || 46 || 915 || 118 || 185 || 311 || 19.9 || 2.6 || 4.0 || 6.8 || align=center|
|-
|align="left"| || align="center"|F || align="left"|Xavier || align="center"|4 || align="center"|– || 204 || 4,485 || 1,151 || 145 || 1,712 || 22.0 || 5.6 || 0.7 || 8.4 || align=center|
|}

T to Z

|-
|align="left"| || align="center"|F || align="left"|Chattanooga || align="center"|2 || align="center"| || 17 || 137 || 18 || 2 || 49 || 8.1 || 1.1 || 0.1 || 2.9 || align=center|
|-
|align="left"| || align="center"|G || align="left"|UNLV || align="center"|1 || align="center"| || 76 || 2,350 || 221 || 407 || 1,438 || 30.9 || 2.9 || 5.4 || 18.9 || align=center|
|-
|align="left"| || align="center"|F || align="left"|Memphis || align="center"|1 || align="center"| || 4 || 24 || 3 || 2 || 7 || 6.0 || 0.8 || 0.5 || 1.8 || align=center|
|-
|align="left"| || align="center"|G || align="left"|Eastern Michigan || align="center"|1 || align="center"| || 4 || 15 || 0 || 1 || 9 || 3.8 || 0.0 || 0.3 || 2.3 || align=center|
|-
|align="left"| || align="center"|G || align="left"|Oklahoma State || align="center"|2 || align="center"|– || 71 || 492 || 47 || 74 || 256 || 6.9 || 0.7 || 1.0 || 3.6 || align=center|
|-
|align="left"| || align="center"|G || align="left"|Syracuse || align="center"|1 || align="center"| || 1 || 15 || 1 || 1 || 2 || 15.0 || 1.0 || 1.0 || 2.0 || align=center|
|-
|align="left"| || align="center"|F/C || align="left"|Arizona || align="center"|1 || align="center"| || 72 || 1,838 || 412 || 91 || 583 || 25.5 || 5.7 || 1.3 || 8.1 || align=center|
|-
|align="left"| || align="center"|F/C || align="left"|Notre Dame || align="center"|2 || align="center"|– || 14 || 39 || 9 || 1 || 9 || 2.8 || 0.6 || 0.1 || 0.6 || align=center|
|-
|align="left"| || align="center"|F || align="left"|Turkey || align="center"|8 || align="center"|–– || 497 || 16,233 || 2,221 || 1,927 || 7,216 || 32.7 || 4.5 || 3.9 || 14.5 || align=center|
|-
|align="left"| || align="center"|F/C || align="left"|Vanderbilt || align="center"|7 || align="center"|– || 411 || 8,162 || 1,484 || 453 || 2,672 || 19.9 || 3.6 || 1.1 || 6.5 || align=center|
|-
|align="left"| || align="center"|G || align="left"|Slovenia || align="center"|1 || align="center"| || 27 || 738 || 63 || 164 || 275 || 27.3 || 2.3 || 6.1 || 10.2 || align=center|
|-
|align="left"| || align="center"|F || align="left"|Memphis || align="center"|2 || align="center"|– || 68 || 564 || 175 || 15 || 145 || 8.3 || 2.6 || 0.2 || 2.1 || align=center|
|-
|align="left"| || align="center"|G || align="left"|Kansas || align="center"|1 || align="center"| || 80 || 1,686 || 118 || 232 || 473 || 21.1 || 1.5 || 2.9 || 5.9 || align=center|
|-
|align="left"| || align="center"|G || align="left"|UNLV || align="center"|1 || align="center"| || 5 || 35 || 4 || 0 || 5 || 7.0 || 0.8 || 0.0 || 1.0 || align=center|
|-
|align="left"| || align="center"|G || align="left"|Michigan State || align="center"|3 || align="center"|– || 151 || 3,517 || 402 || 699 || 1,522 || 23.3 || 2.7 || 4.6 || 10.1 || align=center|
|-
|align="left" bgcolor="#FBCEB1"|* || align="center"|C || align="left"|USC || align="center"|7 || align="center"|– || 485 || 15,293 || 5,191 || 1,279 || 8,128 || 31.5 || 10.7 || 2.6 || 16.8 || align=center|
|-
|align="left"| || align="center"|G || align="left"|Florida State || align="center"|1 || align="center"| || 33 || 469 || 45 || 29 || 194 || 14.2 || 1.4 || 0.9 || 5.9 || align=center|
|-
|align="left"| || align="center"|F/C || align="left"|Virginia Union || align="center"|1 || align="center"| || 81 || 1,959 || 665 || 67 || 390 || 24.2 || 8.2 || 0.8 || 4.8 || align=center|
|-
|align="left"| || align="center"|G || align="left"|Tennessee || align="center"|2 || align="center"|– || 95 || 1,668 || 155 || 202 || 423 || 17.6 || 1.6 || 2.1 || 4.5 || align=center|
|-
|align="left"| || align="center"|G || align="left"|NC State || align="center"|1 || align="center"| || 4 || 34 || 3 || 5 || 12 || 8.5 || 0.8 || 1.3 || 3.0 || align=center|
|-
|align="left"| || align="center"|G || align="left"|Clemson || align="center"|1 || align="center"| || 22 || 290 || 21 || 21 || 78 || 13.2 || 1.0 || 1.0 || 3.5 || align=center|
|-
|align="left"| || align="center"|G || align="left"|Washington || align="center"|1 || align="center"| || 22 || 108 || 12 || 12 || 21 || 4.9 || 0.5 || 0.5 || 1.0 || align=center|
|-
|align="left"| || align="center"|G || align="left"|Long Beach State || align="center"|3 || align="center"|– || 83 || 1,078 || 76 || 200 || 363 || 13.0 || 0.9 || 2.4 || 4.4 || align=center|
|-
|align="left" bgcolor="#FFFF99"|^ || align="center"|G/F || align="left"|Georgia || align="center"|1 || align="center"| || 27 || 252 || 71 || 16 || 134 || 9.3 || 2.6 || 0.6 || 5.0 || align=center|
|-
|align="left"| || align="center"|G/F || align="left"|Chattanooga || align="center"|3 || align="center"|– || 155 || 3,482 || 264 || 252 || 1,230 || 22.5 || 1.7 || 1.6 || 7.9 || align=center|
|-
|align="left"| || align="center"|F/C || align="left"|Arizona || align="center"|2 || align="center"|– || 69 || 1,145 || 328 || 38 || 533 || 16.6 || 4.8 || 0.6 || 7.7 || align=center|
|-
|align="left"| || align="center"|G || align="left"|Florida || align="center"|2 || align="center"|– || 98 || 1,874 || 148 || 322 || 526 || 19.1 || 1.5 || 3.3 || 5.4 || align=center|
|-
|align="left"| || align="center"|F/C || align="left"|Stetson || align="center"|2 || align="center"|– || 6 || 29 || 6 || 2 || 2 || 4.8 || 1.0 || 0.3 || 0.3 || align=center|
|-
|align="left"| || align="center"|F || align="left"|Notre Dame || align="center"|3 || align="center"|– || 225 || 3,996 || 728 || 281 || 1,545 || 17.8 || 3.2 || 1.2 || 6.9 || align=center|
|-
|align="left"| || align="center"|G || align="left"|North Carolina || align="center"|1 || align="center"| || 37 || 525 || 43 || 64 || 183 || 14.2 || 1.2 || 1.7 || 4.9 || align=center|
|-
|align="left"| || align="center"|F/C || align="left"|North Carolina || align="center"|1 || align="center"| || 63 || 1,047 || 185 || 63 || 291 || 16.6 || 2.9 || 1.0 || 4.6 || align=center|
|-
|align="left"| || align="center"|F || align="left"|Stanford || align="center"|2 || align="center"| || 12 || 146 || 39 || 3 || 51 || 12.2 || 3.3 || 0.3 || 4.3 || align=center|
|-
|align="left"| || align="center"|C || align="left"|UNLV || align="center"|1 || align="center"| || 19 || 108 || 35 || 4 || 23 || 5.7 || 1.8 || 0.2 || 1.2 || align=center|
|}

Single Game Leaders

Source: https://stathead.com/tiny/Q80Ry

Source: https://stathead.com/tiny/HPSwv

*NBA Record

Source: https://stathead.com/tiny/gHK6D

External links
Orlando Magic 2007-08 Media guide pp. 134-138
Orlando Magic all-time roster

References

National Basketball Association all-time rosters

roster